Rongmei is a Sino-Tibetan language spoken by the Rongmei Naga community in Northeast India. It has been called Songbu and is close to Zeme and Liangmai. The language has been nomenclatured as "Ruangmei"  and studied as a First Language paper from class I to X of Board of Secondary Education, Manipur. Ruangmei is studied as a Minor Indian Language (MIL) in Class XI & XII of Council of Higher Secondary Education Manipur (COHSEM).

Geography
Rongmei is mostly spoken in the three states of Assam, Manipur and Nagaland.

It is the most spoken language in Tamenglong district and Noney district; and the second most spoken language in Imphal West district and Bishnupur district of Manipur.

Phonology

Consonants

Vowels 

A lower-mid elongated sound [ɐː] also occurs only in word-medial positions.

References

Languages of Assam
Languages of Manipur
Languages of Nagaland
Zeme languages